WDNY (1400 kHz) is an AM radio station broadcasting a classic hits (leaning toward gold-based adult contemporary music) format. WDNY signed on the air in 1978 on October 20 at 1600 kHz.  As an AM daytime-only radio station, WDNY applied for the 1400 frequency and moved there shortly thereafter.
Licensed to Dansville, Livingston County, New York, United States, the station is owned by Genesee Media Corporation.

References

External links

DNY
Classic hits radio stations in the United States
Radio stations established in 1978
1978 establishments in New York (state)